The Australian Service Nurses National Memorial is on Anzac Parade, the principal ceremonial and memorial avenue of Canberra, the capital city of Australia.

The memorial honours past and present nurses of the Australian Defence Force, serving in the Royal Australian Navy, Australian Army, and Royal Australian Air Force and associated services.

The memorial is dedicated "In memory of Australian Service Nurses whose supreme sacrifice, courage and devotion were inspiring to those for whom they so willingly risked their lives. Their memory will also be our sacred trust." It was unveiled on 2 October 1999 by Sir William Deane AC K.B.E.

Sculpture

The memorial is made of cast glass. There are two waved lines each of two sets of panels. The front wall incorporates the words, "beyond all praise".

Etched and cast into the inner walls are text and images, in a timeline sequence, portraying the history and contribution of Australian Service Nursing. The memorial also incorporates a collage of pictures and diary entries in the original handwriting.

Some panels are blank, symbolic of the inconclusive nature of any memorial to a service group. The interlocking walls are symbolic of nurturing hands. A contemplative space surrounded with rosemary (for remembrance) has a reflective pool fountain and the symbols of the armed forces. There are also places for additional plaques to name occasions when nurses have served.

Funding
The memorial was funded through the efforts of the Australian Service Nurses National Memorial Fund Committee, whose members have included:
 Ita Buttrose
 Wilma Oram
 Betty Jeffrey 
 Vivian Bullwinkel

Principal Donors to the memorial included:
 Australian Nursing Federation (Victorian Branch)
 Health Care Of Australia
 New South Wales Nurses' Association
 Nurses Board Of Victoria
 Nurses Board Of Western Australia
 Nurses Memorial Centre (Inc) Of Western Australia
 Nurses Registration Board Of New South Wales
 Returned Sisters Sub-Branch R &Sl (Queensland)
 Returned Sisters Sub-Branch R &Sl (South Australia)
 Royal College Of Nursing, Australia
 The Pratt Foundation
 The Queensland Nursing Council
 The Returned & Services League Of Australia
 The Wesley Hospital - Nursing Division

References
 PNGAA Library dedication of the Australian Services Nurses National Memorial

Military memorials in Canberra
Australian military memorials
Monuments and memorials to women
Nursing monuments and memorials